The 2018 Coca-Cola Firecracker 250 was the 16th stock car race of the 2018 NASCAR Xfinity Series season and the 17th iteration of the event. The race was held on Friday, July 6, 2018, in Daytona Beach, Florida at Daytona International Speedway, a 2.5 miles (4.0 km) permanent triangular-shaped superspeedway. The race was extended from its scheduled 100 laps to 105 due to a NASCAR overtime finish. At race's end, a close, but controversial finish would see Chip Ganassi Racing driver Kyle Larson win his 11th career NASCAR Xfinity Series win and his third of his part-time season. To fill out the podium, Elliott Sadler of JR Motorsports and Christopher Bell of Joe Gibbs Racing would finish second and third, respectively.

In a controversial ruling, GMS Racing driver Justin Haley, who had initially won the race was instead disqualified from his win due to him passing Larson below the yellow line, moving him to the last position on the lead lap, which was 18th.

Background 

Daytona International Speedway is one of three superspeedways to hold NASCAR races, the other two being Indianapolis Motor Speedway and Talladega Superspeedway. The standard track at Daytona International Speedway is a four-turn superspeedway that is 2.5 miles (4.0 km) long. The track's turns are banked at 31 degrees, while the front stretch, the location of the finish line, is banked at 18 degrees.

Entry list 

*Withdrew.

Practice

First practice 
The first practice session was held on Thursday, July 5, at 1:05 PM EST, and would last for 50 minutes.

Second practice 
The second and final practice session, sometimes referred to as Happy Hour, was held on Thursday, July 5, at 3:05 PM EST, and would last for 50 minutes.

Starting lineup 
Qualifying was originally going to be held on Friday, July 6, at 2:10 PM EST. However, rain would cancel the qualifying session, forcing NASCAR to resort to the rulebook to set up the lineup, using the current 2018 owner's points. As a result, Ryan Preece of Joe Gibbs Racing won the pole.

Full starting lineup

Race results 
Stage 1 Laps: 30

Stage 2 Laps: 30

Stage 3 Laps: 45

Notes

References 

2018 NASCAR Xfinity Series
NASCAR races at Daytona International Speedway
July 2018 sports events in the United States
2018 in sports in Florida
NASCAR controversies